Slangerup is a town in Frederikssund Municipality, about 30 km north-west of central Copenhagen, in the Capital Region of Denmark.

The town of Slangerup
The town was established by the Viking Slangir at the time of Harald Bluetooth. King Eric I of Denmark (ca. 1070-July 1103), was born in Slangerup.  In the 13th century the town was the scene of activities involving both Bishop Absalon and Valdemar the Great.  Thomas Kingo grew up and was priest in the town during the 17th century.

The municipality of Slangerup
Until 1 January 2007, Slangerup was also a municipality covering an area of 46 km² with a total population of 9,237 (2005). Slangerup Municipality ceased as a result of the 2007 Municipal Reform (Kommunalreformen), being merged into Frederikssund municipality along with Jægerspris and Skibby municipalities. This created a municipality with an area of 260 km² and a total population of ca. 44,140.

Sport
Slangerup Speedway Klub is situated on the west side of the town at Hørup Skovvej 5A.

Notable people
 Eric I of Denmark (ca.1060 in Slangerup – 1103) also known as Eric the Good
 Thomas Kingo (1634 at Slangerup – 1703 in Odense) a Danish bishop, poet and hymn-writer born
 Jesper Hoffmeyer (born 1942 in Slangerup) emeritus professor at the University of Copenhagen Institute of Biology, leading figure in biosemiotics
 Peter Beier (born 1965 in Slangerup) founded the eponymous Danish premium chocolate manufacturing and retailing company in 1996
 Jesper Hansen (born 1985 in Slangerup) a Danish football goalkeeper for Lyngby BK, 340 club caps

References

 Municipal statistics: NetBorger Kommunefakta, delivered from KMD aka Kommunedata (Municipal Data)
 Municipal mergers and neighbors: Eniro new municipalities map

External links
Website for the new municipality

Former municipalities of Denmark
Cities and towns in the Capital Region of Denmark
Frederikssund Municipality